USJF Ravinala is a Malagasy football club based in Antananarivo. In 2004, they won a triple of the THB Champions League, Coupe de Madagascar and the Analamanga Regional League.

Achievements

THB Champions League: 1
2004

Coupe de Madagascar: 1
2004

Performance in CAF competitions
CAF Champions League: 1 appearance
2005 – First Round

CAF Confederation Cup: 1 appearance
2006 – Second Round

Current squad

Antananarivo
Football clubs in Madagascar